I Love You is a recording act fronted by Justin Randel that is based in 
Brooklyn, New York.  Formed in 2004 as a trio, the project used various names until late in that year when Yah Tibyah La Blu (a slightly bastardized translation of "I Love You" in Russian) became "official."  
For practical reasons, the group began using the English phrase by the release of their first recordings.
  
In 2006, bassist Kevin Kesterson departed, making a duo of the group. Then in 2008, drummer Jeffrey Schlette parted ways with I Love You, making Randel the sole member. In 2009, video artist Charlie Mylie joined up with Randel, throwing psychedelic visuals into the mix during live performances. During October of that year the duo released their first recording for Indianapolis, Indiana's Joyful Noise Recordings, Bell Ord Forrest.

In 2008, I Love You became a solo act again. According to his MySpace page, frontman Justin Randel released Feeling Bad To Feel Better in October 2011 on CD and cassette. In 2014, after previous member Jeffrey Schlette died, Justin Randel changed his moniker to Reaches.

Reception
Jason Harper in The Pitch called the band "promising" as it "thrashes about in the secret playroom between punk and indie rock, ... crafting paradoxically sloppy and intricate experimental pop."  Harper continued, "Randel's polyrhythmic guitar loops distract the listener while Schlette gradually builds a hip-jerking beat that climaxes in frantic, shouted vocals and disco-ball-slicing riffs. It's crazy danceable, but only if you're crazy."

Gabriel Keehn of Tiny Mix Tapes wrote, "the sense of legitimate, fresh tinkering-for-the-sake-of-tinkering and corner-of-the-sandbox fun here is genuine, but this has surely been done before, and it's been done a lot better" in giving the CD Drone, Drugs and Harmony three out of five stars.

Simon Lewis and Stefan Ek of Terrascope wrote of Bell Ord Forrest, "Here’s the most charming music ... It’s rhythmic and polyrhythmic, it’s like Talking Heads or B52 being converted into this millenniums Now People. It’s happy and it’s inventive. It’s Party!"

Discography
 2006: Six Trick Pony (CD) self-release
 2006: Davan/I Love You (12 inch split) self-release
 2008: Drone, Drugs and Harmony (CD and tape) self-release
 2009: Bell Ord Forrest (CD and tape) Joyful Noise
 2011: Feeling Bad To Feel Better (CD and tape) Pecan Crazy Records
 2013: Pseudodoxia (Vinyl, CD and tape) We Be Friends Records
 2016: I am Alive and Well (Vinyl, CD and tape) We Be Friends Records
 2019: Wherever the Internet Goes, Sorrow Follows  (Vinyl, CD and tape) We Be Friends Records

References

External links
http://www.iloveyouband.com
http://iloveyou.bandcamp.com/
 Reaches at Reaches music blog
 I Love You at I Love You music blog
 I Love You at We Be Friends Records
 I Love You at Joyful Noise Recordings
Reviews
"Reaches' New Single" at xlr8r March 2019
"Bell Ord Forrest (review)" at Babysue October 2009. (5/5).
"I Love You: Bell Ord Forrest" (Album Review) on Fensepost.com. October 26, 2009.
"Bell Ord Forrest Review" on Indie Surfer blog. October 29, 2009.
"MP3 @ 3PM - I Love You" on Magnet Magazine. November 19, 2009.
Video/audio
I Love You interview with Beijing, China's Niurenku October, 2012
Punkcast 1222: I Love You at Punkcast. November 2, 2007.
"I Love You - March of the Dead + Video" on The Devil Has The Best Tuna blog. January 1, 2008. 
"Song of the Day - The Colloquialism Is Simply Gas by I Love You" at Present Magazine. September 28, 2009.
"Joyful Noise releases Bell Ord Forrest by new signing I Love You TODAY!" on Movement News blog (Press release). October 27, 2009.

Musical groups established in 2004
Alternative rock groups from Illinois
Indie rock musical groups from Illinois
American new wave musical groups
Musical groups from Chicago